U-89 may refer to one of the following German submarines:

, a Type U 87 submarine launched in 1916 and that served in the First World War until sunk on 12 February 1918
 During the First World War, Germany also had this submarine with a similar name:
 , a Type VIIC submarine that served in the Second World War until sunk on 12 May 1943

Submarines of Germany